Bantú Mama is a 2021 Dominican drama film directed by Ivan Herrera and written by Ivan Herrera and Clarisse Albrecht. Produced by Ivan Herrera, Clarisse Albrecht, Nicolas LaMadrid and Franmiris Lombert, it was filmed in the Dominican Republic, France and Senegal. The film tells the story of Emma (Clarisse Albrecht), a French woman of African descent who manages to escape after being arrested in the Dominican Republic. She finds shelter in the most dangerous district of Santo Domingo, where she is taken in by a group of children (Scarlet Reyes, Euris Javiel and Arturo Perez). By becoming their protégée and maternal figure, she experiences an unimaginable change in her destiny.

The film was selected as the Dominican entry for the Best International Feature Film at the 95th Academy Awards,. ARRAY acquired the distribution rights to the film in the United States, Canada, United Kingdom, Australia and New Zealand, and it was released on Netflix on 17 November 2022.

Release 
It had its world premiere on 16 March 2021, at South By South West, being the first Dominican feature film to be selected by the festival.

Awards and Nominations

References

External links 
 

2021 films
2021 multilingual films
Films set in Africa
Films shot in the Dominican Republic
Films set in France
Films set in Senegal
Dominican Republic drama films
2020s Spanish-language films